Kloster is a village in Hedemora Municipality, Dalarna, Sweden. 

Populated places in Dalarna County